Aerobics Oz Style is an Australian aerobic exercise instruction television series, shown in Australia on weekends and then weekdays on Network Ten at  then  and distributed to many other countries. It was cancelled by Network Ten at the end of 2005.

AOS continues to be broadcast on Australian television via Aurora Channel 183 - on the Foxtel Digital, Optus and Austar platforms - which broadcasts Aerobics Oz Style every day at 6.30am AEST and also 2.00pm AEST. In Europe Aerobics Oz Style is broadcast daily (weekends included) on Sky Sports 1 or Sky Sports 2 at 6:00 (GMT) and it is repeated daily on Sky Sports 3 or Sky Sports 4 at 11:30 and 16:30. In 2011 Sky Sports started to broadcast additional airings of the show. The program is now aired in the small hours of the morning, as early as, 00:30 (GMT).

TV series background
Aerobics Oz Style, was created and produced by Harry Michaels and began in 1982 and ran continuously through until 2005, with over 4,500 episodes produced, by production company Zero1Zero (now Silk Studios). The format remained consistent throughout its run. Each show was 30 minutes divided into four segments, one of warmup exercises, two main exercise segments, and a stretch/cool-down segment. One instructor leads the exercises, with four demonstrators following to the side and behind.  Later shows were shot outdoors at scenic locations around Sydney, in earlier shows an indoor studio was used.

Format
Each show had an exercise theme. The mainstays since inception included high and low-impact, legs, abdominals, body toning. Other later themes included kick-boxing, low impact with a mixture of Latin dancing and pilates. Older styles included light hand weights and dynabands. Fashions in exercise-wear moved with the times too, leotards over bicycle shorts in the early days giving way to halter tops and tight shorts.

The instructors and demonstrators on the show were a mixture of men and women. The show was intended for any age or gender.

Many children watched the series inadvertently as they had switched on their televisions too early for the popular children's series Cheez TV which came after.

Tie-in Merchandise
A set of Aerobics Oz Style exercise videos are sold in a longer format than the shows broadcast, and include some exercise styles not otherwise featured, such as Swiss ball. These videos included music that remained unique and separate from the television show.

Theme music
Australian band TISM parodied Aerobics Oz Style in their 1998 music video for "Whatareya?", in which all members start off following the instructor before drinking (and throwing) beer cans and jumping over couches.

In 1998 U NO HU, a UK songwriting and music production duo, consisting of Gary Williams and Philip Barber were brought onboard and commissioned to write a mixture of more than three hundred instrumental dance tracks and chill-out tracks specifically for the television broadcasts and later exercise videos. The new, uplifting, music featured on over 1,500 later shows increased viewer ratings by twenty percent – on the BSkyB network – adding to the already established popularity of the program.

Talent
 June Jones — (1983-2005) — instructor and demonstrator, a founding member of the show
 Wendi Carroll — (1990-2005) — instructor and demonstrator
 Taryn Noble (née Polovin) — (1998-2005) — instructor and demonstrator
 Helen Tardent — (2000-2005) — instructor for the pilates shows, joined the series with the introduction of those shows.  Tardent was previously a professional dancer at the London Royal Academy of Dance and now owns and operates a Pilates studio in Double Bay, Sydney
 Kate McCracken — (2002-2005) — demonstrator and dancer
 Erinjayne Gard  — (2000-2005) — demonstrator
 Jodie Low — (1996-2002) — demonstrator, winner of the 1996 Miss Fitness Australia title
 Amanda Breen — instructor and demonstrator - rumoured to take over Trainer role on Biggest Loser Australia, Now Director - People & Culture at Les Mills Asia Pacific

References

External links
 Official website

Australian non-fiction television series
Aerobic exercise
Network 10 original programming
1982 Australian television series debuts
2005 Australian television series endings
2012 Australian television series debuts
1990s Australian television series